The year 1721 in science and technology involved some significant events.

Medicine
 The use of ether is developed as a pain-killer.
 Lady Mary Wortley Montagu introduces the Ottoman Turkish method of inoculation against smallpox – variolation – to London.
 Thomas Guy founds Guy's Hospital in London to treat "incurables" discharged from St Thomas'.

Psychology
 A suggestion box is developed under the eighth shōgun of Japan, Yoshimune Tokugawa.

Technology
 Richard Newsham of London obtains his first patent for a manual fire pump.

Deaths
 September 11 – Rudolf Jakob Camerarius, German botanist (born 1665)

References

 
18th century in science
1720s in science